Clear Creek Township is the name of two townships in the U.S. state of Indiana:

 Clear Creek Township, Huntington County, Indiana
 Clear Creek Township, Monroe County, Indiana

See also
Clear Creek Township (disambiguation)

Indiana township disambiguation pages